Tordelpalo is a hamlet located in the municipality of Molina de Aragón, in Guadalajara province, Castilla–La Mancha, Spain. As of 2020, it has a population of 6.

Geography 
Tordelpalo is located 148km east of Guadalajara, Spain.

References

Populated places in the Province of Guadalajara